The Eastern Expedition encompassed the Taiping Heavenly Kingdom's efforts to capture the Yangtze River Delta, the provinces of Jiangsu, Anhui, and Zhejiang. Most of the areas would eventually be occupied by the Taipings, but they were notably repulsed at several locations, especially the city of Shanghai. Following the Jintian uprising in the southern province Guangxi and the beginning of open hostilities, Taiping forces attacked and captured Nanjing in central China by 1853. The Western Expedition captures cities along the Yangtze River like Zhenjiang, Anqing were captured later the same year. 

When Hong Rengan arrived in Tianjing in 1859, he became one of the most senior military officials. Hong uses a strategy to Qing's attention away from Tianjing by attacking areas to the east like Hangzhou and Suzhou. Then Taiping forces counter attack Qing armies besieging the capital, successfully lifting the siege. In 1860, during the Second rout the Army Group Jiangnan (1860) Taiping forces capture the following cities: Changzhou (May 26), Wuxi (May 30), Suzhou (June 2),  Wujiang (13 June), Jiaxing (15 June). Ningbo is captured by the Taipings in December 1861. Taiping armies advance towards Shanghai by 1861, but are repulsed with the help of foreign mayos like the Ever Victorious Army.

References

Battles of the Taiping Rebellion